Hugh Bernard Price (born 1941) is a U.S. activist. He served as the President of the National Urban League from 1994 to 2003.

Price is a member of Alpha Phi Alpha fraternity.

Price is a member of the advisory board of the Future of American Democracy Foundation, a nonprofit, nonpartisan foundation in partnership with Yale University Press and the Yale Center for International and Area Studies  , "dedicated to research and education aimed at renewing and sustaining the historic vision of American democracy."

Price was elected to the American Philosophical Society in 1995 and the American Academy of Arts and Sciences in 2000. He received the Westchester County Trailblazers Award in 2014.

Price is currently a senior fellow in Economic Studies at the Brookings Institution.

References

External links 
 Hugh B. Price - Brookings Institution

Hugh B. Price (AC 1963) Papers at the Amherst College Archives & Special Collections

1941 births
Amherst College alumni
Living people
Members of the American Philosophical Society
African-American history of Westchester County, New York